Rémi Fournier (born 3 November 1983) is a French former professional footballer who played as a defender.

References 
 
 
 

1983 births
Living people
Footballers from Marseille
French footballers
Association football defenders
US Marseille Endoume players
FC Martigues players
AC Ajaccio players
LB Châteauroux players
Red Star F.C. players
AJ Auxerre players
Ligue 2 players
Championnat National players